Idaho Legislative District 31 is one of 35 districts of the Idaho Legislature. It is currently represented by Steve Bair, Republican  of Blackfoot, Neil Anderson, Republican of Blackfoot, and Julie VanOrden, Republican of Pingree.

District profile (2012–present) 
District 31 currently consists of all of Bingham County.

District profile (2002–2012) 
From 2002 to 2012, District 31 consisted of all of Bear Lake, Caribou, Franklin, and Oneida Counties and a portion of Bannock County.

District profile (1992–2002) 
From 1992 to 2002, District 31 consisted of all of Butte County and portion of Bingham County.

See also

 List of Idaho Senators
 List of Idaho State Representatives

References

External links
Idaho Legislative District Map (with members)
Idaho Legislature (official site)

31
Bingham County, Idaho